Mitha  is a village in Kapurthala district of Punjab State, India. The village is administrated by a Sarpanch who is an elected representative.

Demography
According to the 2011 Census of India, Mitha had 45 houses and a population of 209, of which 106 were males and 103 females. The literacy rate was 71.82%, lower than the state average of 75.84%. The population of children under the age of 6 was 28, being 13.40% of total population, and the child sex ratio was approximately 474, lower than state average of 846.

Population data

Air travel connectivity 
The closest airport to the village is Sri Guru Ram Dass Jee International Airport.

Villages in Kapurthala

References

External links
  Villages in Kapurthala

Villages in Kapurthala district